Dærick Gröss Sr. (born January 28, 1947) is an illustrator, writer, editor, and art director. Gross worked at comic book companies Marvel Comics, DC Comics, Chaos! Comics, Image Comics, and Innovation Publishing, primarily in the 1990s, and more recently at his own company, Studio G, with his son, Dærick Gröss. He was the visual editor at inDELible Comics, and the art director at ACP Comics. 

As of 2008, he lived in Simi Valley, California.

Early life and education 
Gröss was born in the Dayton suburb of Kettering, Ohio on January 27, 1947, and was a comic book fan from childhood. He later attended Ohio University from 1965-1967 studying art and theatre. He was a member of the fraternity, Phi Kappa Theta. Dissatisfied with the art instruction at the university, he went to the Central Academy of Commercial Art in Cincinnati, Ohio in 1969.

Career

Early career 
After graduation, Gröss worked at WCPO-TV in Cincinnati, Ohio as a live set designer and created art for on camera graphics for 3 years. Gröss joined the Cincinnati Post as a staff artist and cartoonist, eventually becoming the Art Director as illustrator and page designer.

Murciélaga She-Bat 
Gröss answered a CFW Magazine ad which started his career in comics. In 1988, he with created the latina-mutant Murciélaga She-Bat, a part of the REIKI team in Robo Warriors. 

In the early 1990s, two issues of Murciélaga She-Bat were published by Heroic Publishing, and issue #3 by Revolutionary Comics. In 2000, 2 comics featuring Murciélaga were released as a bilingual flipbook in both Spanish and English. Heroic Publishing later reprinted the original 8 issues of the series.

Innovation Comics 
Dærick Gröss painted interior art for 12 issues of an adaptation of the Anne Rice Vampire Lestat Series published by Innovation Comics. He won Comicon's Russ Manning award for most promising newcomer.

In 1992, Gröss also painted cover art for Forbidden Planet issues #1-4, also published by Innovation.

Marvel and DC 
Gröss penciled issues #84 and #88 of Excalibur for Marvel Comics in 1995. He penciled part 7 of the short-lived CyberComics initiative from Marvel featuring Spiderman in 1996. He also penciled a portion of X Force/Cable Annual #1 in 1995, and X-Men: Domino issue #1 in 1997.

At DC Comics, Gröss penciled Batman: Two-Face Strikes Twice issues #1 and #2 in 1993.

Other Work 

At adult comic book publisher Carnal Comics, Gröss drew several projects in the 90's.

He illustrated The Guide to Getting it On published by Goofy Foot Press which was written by psychoanalyst and author Paul Joannides. Originally published in 1996, it is an educational sexual manual.

As penciler and inker he also worked on Gay Comics issue #24.

Gröss contributed to the Marvel trading card game, Overpower and Game of Thrones cards for Fantasy Flight Games.

His production company Dærick Gröss Studios, was founded in 1989, then renamed Studio G in 1990. His son Dærick Gröss works with him. In 2001, a fire destroyed most of his studio.

Gröss produces T-Shirt designs, prints, and other product featuring his work.  

He turned to political cartooning in 2019 with the satirical comic Trumpy.

Awards 

 1991 Russ Manning Most Promising Newcomer Award

Bibliography

Contributions

Innovation Comics 

 Anne Rice's The Vampire Lestat issues #1-12 (1990–91)
 Anne Rice's Interview With the Vampire issue #2 (1991)
 Anne Rice's Queen of the Damned issue #2 (1991)
 The Vampire Companion issues #1-2 (1991)
 Forbidden Planet issues #1-4 (1992)
 Forbidden Planet: The Saga of the Krell issue #1 (1993)
 Hero Alliance issue #17 (1991)
 The Colour of Magic issues #1-4 (1991)
 The Shadow of the Torturer issues #2-3 (1991)
 Bozo: The World's Most Famous Clown vol.1 (1992)

Heroic Publishing 

 Murciélaga: She-Bat issues #1-5 #8-16 (1993-2017)
 Reiki Warriors Special issue #1 (2013)
 Tigress issue #3 (1992)
 Lady Arcane issues #1-2 (1992)
 League of Champions issue #9 (1990)
 Champions Classics issue #4 (1992)
 The Adventures of Chrissie Claus issue #3 (1991)
 Sparkplug issue #1 (1993)
 Flare issues #1 #5 #11 #30 #34 (2004–06)
 Flare Adventures issues #3 #6 (1992–93)
 Flare: The New Adventures vol. 6 issue #1 (2006)
 Liberty Girl issue #0 (2006)
 Liberty Girl: The Return issue #1 (2007)
 Tales Of The Champions Presents: Tigress issue #3 (2006)
 WitchGirls Inc. issue #10 (2011)
 The Infinites issue #1 (2011)

Image Comics 

 Bloodwulf issues #1-4 (1995)

Marvel Comics 

 Excalibur issue #84 #88 (1994–95)
 Excalibur Annual issue #2 (1994)
 Excalibur Visionaries: Warren Ellis issue #1 (2010)
 Midnight Sons issue #7 (1994)
 Captain Marvel issue #5 (1996)
 Cable issue #10 (1996)
 X-Force / Cable '95 issue #5 (1995)
 Cosmic Powers Unlimited issue #3 (1995)
 X-Men: Domino issue #1 (2018)
 Cable & X-Force: Onslaught Rising (2018)

Malibu Comics 

 Neuroscope issues #1-5 (1992–93)
 Solution issue #16 (1995)

Chaos! Comics 

 Evil Ernie: The Resurrection issue #1 (1994)
 Purgatori issue #1 (1998)
 Purgatori vs. Vampirella issue #1 (2000)
 Lady Death: Last Rites issue #2 (2001)
 Lady Death: Retribution issue #1 (1998)
 Lady Death vs. Vampirella II issue #1 (2000)
 Lady Death/Bedlam issue #1 (2002)
 Jade: Redemption issue #2 (2002)
 The Undead issue #1 (2002)

DC Comics 

 Batman: Two-Face Strikes Twice issues #1.2 #2.2 (1993)

AK Comics 

 Shred Comics issues #1-2 #8 (1989)
 Jalia issues #1-3 (2006)

Sicilian Dragon Publishing 

 Anne Rice's Tale of the Body Thief issues #1-4 (1999)

Revolutionary Publishing 

 Heavy Metal Monsters issues #1-3 (1992–93)

CFW Enterprises 

 Tales of the Kung-Fu Warriors issue #12 (1989)
 Robo Warriors issues #2 #4-8 (1988)

Carnal Comics 

 Rebecca Bardoux issue #1 (1994)
 Brittany O'Connell issue #1 (1996)
 Porn Star Fantasies issue #6 (1996)
 Sahara Sands issue #1 (1997)
 Women of Porn: A Cartoon History issue #1 (1999)

Kitchen Sink Press 

 Gay Comix issue #24 (1996)

Sky Comics 

 Blood & Roses: Search for the Time Stone issue #1 (1994)

Bishop Press 

 Rose 'n' Gunn issue #2-3 (1995)

Knight Press 

 Blood & Roses Adventures issue #1 (1995)

Marz Publishing 

 Jinn Warriors issue #1 (2012)

inDELLible Comics 

 InDELLiprose issue #1 (2018)

References 

Fantasy artists
American illustrators
American speculative fiction artists
People from Simi Valley, California
1947 births
Living people